West Virginia Route 99 is an east–west state highway in southern West Virginia. The western terminus of the route is at West Virginia Route 85 northeast of Kopperston in the rural southeast corner of Boone County. The eastern terminus is at West Virginia Route 3 in Glen Daniel.

The section of WV 99 west of Bolt was constructed after 1968.  Most of this stretch, approximately the westernmost , is built in a nearly continuous series of cuts in the side of Guyandotte Mountain.

Major intersections

References

099
Transportation in Boone County, West Virginia
Transportation in Raleigh County, West Virginia
Transportation in Wyoming County, West Virginia